Corisco International Airport , or just Corisco Airport, is an airport serving the island of Corisco in the Litoral Province of Equatorial Guinea. It was opened on 10 October 2011.

History 
The airport was originally conceived as part of a project aiming to turn the island of Corisco into an important centre of tourism. The Moroccan construction company  was placed in charge of the construction of the site.

The second vice prime minister Demetrio Eló Ndong Nsefumu visited the Corisco Island airport on 5 October 2011 to personally verify the facility's construction progress.

On 10 October, the president of Equatorial Guinea and the first lady met there, accompanied by the president of Gabon, Ali Bongo Ondimba, who was the guest of honour at the opening ceremony of the new airport. The ministers and members of the Government of Equatorial Guinea and diplomatic representatives from countries including Spain, Morocco, the United States, China, and Cuba were also present. The president gave a speech on the importance of the new airport's impact on tourism. After the opening ceremony, the presidents of Equatorial Guinea and Gabon, together with the Equatoguinean first lady, prime minister, and the rest of the guests from the government, toured the modern facilities of the new airport.

See also

List of airports in Equatorial Guinea
Transport in Equatorial Guinea

References

External links
 HERE Maps - Corisco
 OpenStreetMap - Corisco
 OurAirports - Corisco

Airports in Equatorial Guinea

Airports established in 2011